The Academy of Magical Arts gives out awards annually at its Academy of the Magical Arts Awards event. Nominess for the performance awards are chosen from those that have performed at The Magic Castle in the previous year. Other awards are given to individuals who have made significant contributions to the field of magic.

Magician of the Year

Close-up Magician of the Year

Stage Magician of the Year

Visiting Magician of the Year

Lecturer of the Year

Parlour Magician of the Year

Comedy Magician of the Year

Bar Magician of the Year

Masters Fellowship

Performing Fellowship

Creative Fellowship

Literary & Media Fellowship

Special Fellowship

Lifetime Achievement Fellowship

Award of Merit

Junior Achievement Award

Junior Award Merit

Special Recognition Award

Special Achievement Award

Blackstone Theatre Award

Strolling Magician

Technical Achievement Award

Devant Award

References 

Academy of Magical Arts
Academy of Magical Arts
Academy of Magical Arts